El Grullo is a town and municipality, in Jalisco in central-western Mexico. The municipality covers an area of 157.2 km². It is named for a color, used for horses and grass, called grullo, used as the name of an Hacienda established there: "La Hacienda del Zacate Grullo".  

As of 2005, the municipality had a total population of 21,825.

In recent years, the town of El Grullo has begun expanding and now has begun to construct suburban-style housing developments on the outer limits of the town. There have also been new points of interest adding in the town center such as an obelisk, a larger city hall, and accessible WiFi throughout the town center.  , there are about 30,000 residents living in the developing city limits.

References

Municipalities of Jalisco